Sangyab Sar (also Romanized as Sangyāb Sar; also known as Sang Kīāb Sar) is a village in Kolbad-e Gharbi Rural District, Kolbad District, Galugah County, Mazandaran Province, Iran. At the 2006 census, its population was 345, in 81 families.

References 

Populated places in Galugah County